Yannis Letard (born 18 August 1998) is a French professional footballer who plays as a defender for Austrian club LASK.

References

External links
 
 

1998 births
Living people
Footballers from Loire-Atlantique
French footballers
Association football defenders
VfR Aalen players
FC St. Gallen players
LASK players
Swiss Super League players
3. Liga players
Championnat National 3 players
Austrian Football Bundesliga players
French expatriate footballers
Expatriate footballers in Germany
Expatriate footballers in Switzerland
Expatriate footballers in Austria
French expatriate sportspeople in Germany
French expatriate sportspeople in Switzerland
French expatriate sportspeople in Austria